Chrung may refer to:
 Chrung, a village in Kak Commune, Bar Kaev District, Cambodia
 Chrung, a village in Ke Chong Commune, Cambodia